National Highway 233B is a National Highway in India that links Bilaspur, Chhattisgarh to Siddharath Nagar in Uttar Pradesh.

See also
 List of National Highways in India by highway number
 National Highways Development Project

References 

233B
National highways in India (old numbering)
Rajesultanpur